Reaching from Heaven is a 1948 American drama film directed by Frank Strayer, which stars Hugh Beaumont, Cheryl Walker, and John Qualen. The screenplay was written by Charles Palmer, from an original story by Henry Rische and H. W. Gockel.

Cast list
 Hugh Beaumont as Bill Starling
 Cheryl Walker as Madeline Bradley
 John Qualen as The stranger
 Regis Toomey as Pastor
 Chas. Evans as Walter Graves
 Margaret Hamilton as Sophia Manley
 Addison Richards as Max Bradley
 Nana Bryant as Mrs. Kay Bradley
 Mae Clarke as Dorothy Gram
 Jack Lambert as Buck Huggins
 Ann Lee Doran as Martha Kestner
 George Chandler as Bert Kestner
 Gene Roth as Kestners' neighbor

References

External links
 
 
 

1948 drama films
1948 films
American drama films
American black-and-white films
Films directed by Frank R. Strayer
Films about Christianity
Lutheran Church–Missouri Synod
1940s American films